Michael or Mike Robinson may refer to:

Arts and humanities
 Michael Robinson (Canadian artist) (1948–2010), poet and printmaker
 Michael F. Robinson (born 1933), English composer and musicologist
 Michael Massey Robinson (1744–1826), poet
 Michael S. Robinson (1910–1999), British art historian
 Michael Eric Robinson (born 1956), American composer

Sports

American football
 Michael Robinson (cornerback) (born 1973), NFL player for the Green Bay Packers in 1996
 Michael Robinson (fullback) (born 1983), NFL player for the Seattle Seahawks from 2010 to 2013
 Michael Robinson (arena football) (born 1986), AFL player for the Kansas City Command
 Mike Robinson (defensive end) (born 1956), NFL player for the Cleveland Browns in 1981 & 1982

Association football (soccer)
 Michael Robinson (footballer) (1958–2020), Irish footballer from 1975–1989, television pundit in Spain thereafter
 Mike Robinson (soccer) (born 1958), American former soccer forward
 Mike Robinson (footballer, born 1968) (born 1968), English footballer for Darlington

Other sports
 Michael Robinson (figure skater), British figure skater
 Michael Robinson (cricketer) (born 1967), Australian cricketer
 Mike Robinson (basketball, born 1976), American basketball player
 Mike Robinson (basketball, born 1952), American basketball player, winner of the Frances Pomeroy Naismith Award

Other people
 Michael Robinson (rabbi) (1924–2006), activist for civil and human rights
 Michael H. Robinson (1929–2008), British zoologist
 Michael Vernon Robinson (born 1956), American automobile designer
 Michael Waller Robinson (1837–1912), American politician
 Mike Robinson (Alberta politician), Alberta Liberal Party politician and former president & CEO of Glenbow Museum
 Mike Robinson (businessman), founder and president of Eastwood Guitars